Sawkuchi is the locality in Guwahati, Assam, India; surrounded by the localities of Lokhra, Kerakuchi and Bhetapara.

Sports
The Indira Gandhi Athletic Stadium is partly located here.

See also
Panjabari
Basistha

References

Neighbourhoods in Guwahati